The 56th New Brunswick Legislative Assembly was created following a general election in 2006.  Its members were sworn-in on October 3, 2006 but it was called into session by the Lieutenant-Governor of New Brunswick on February 6, 2007.

Leadership
Eugene McGinley, was elected speaker at the first session of the Assembly on February 6, 2007 but resigned on October 31, 2007 to join the cabinet. Roy Boudreau was elected speaker on November 27, 2007.

Premier of New Brunswick Shawn Graham leads the government.

Former Premier Bernard Lord was nominal leader of the opposition until January 31, 2007 at which time he resigned his seat and was replaced by interim leader of the Progressive Conservatives, Jeannot Volpé.  On October 18, 2008, David Alward was elected leader of the Progressive Conservatives, his first sitting as leader of the opposition was November 25, 2008.

Members
Most of the current members were elected at the 36th general election held on September 18, 2006. The exceptions are Chris Collins, who was elected in a by-election on March 5, 2007 as a result of the resignation of Bernard Lord on January 31, 2007; Jack Carr, who was elected in a by-election on November 3, 2008 as a result of the resignation of Keith Ashfield; and Burt Paulin, who was elected in a by-election on March 9, 2009 as a result of the resignation of Percy Mockler, Paul took his seat on March 20, 2009.  The standing of the legislature also changed when MLAs Joan MacAlpine-Stiles and Wally Stiles crossed the floor from the Progressive Conservatives to the Liberals on April 17, 2007.

bold denotes a member of the Executive Council of New Brunswick
italics denotes a party leader
† denotes the speaker

Standings changes since the 2006 general election

Membership changes
Bernard Lord, a Progressive Conservative, was first elected in a 1998 by-election and served as Premier of New Brunswick from 1999 to 2006. He resigned his Moncton East seat on January 31, 2007.
Keith Ashfield, a Progressive Conservative, was first elected in the 1999 general election and served as deputy speaker from 1999 to 2003 and in the cabinet from 2003 to 2006. He resigned his New Maryland-Sunbury West seat on September 8, 2008 to seek election to the federal parliament.
December 22, 2008 Percy Mockler, Restigouche-la-Vallée was appointed to the Senate of Canada
February 9, 2010 Mike Murphy, Moncton North resigns his seat and cabinet post.
February 28, 2010 Rose-May Poirier, Rogersville-Kouchibouguac was appointed to the Senate of Canada

See also
2006 New Brunswick general election
Legislative Assembly of New Brunswick

References

Terms of the New Brunswick Legislature
2006 establishments in New Brunswick
2010 disestablishments in New Brunswick